Suomen Sotilas (Finnish: Finland’s Soldier) is a Finnish-language military magazine published in Helsinki, Finland. Founded in 1919, it is one of the oldest publications in the country.

History and profile
Suomen Sotilas was established in 1919. The magazine is headquartered in Helsinki. It was initially published weekly and featured articles on morality, military virtues and the risks of adopting a Bolshevik approach. Later the scope of the magazine was expanded. It mostly covers articles about Finnish security policy, security strategy, the art of warfare and military technology.

In its first year Suomen Sotilas sold 4,000 copies. By 1920 the circulation rose to over 12,000 copies.

References

External links
  

1919 establishments in Finland
Finnish-language magazines
Magazines established in 1919
Magazines published in Helsinki
Military magazines
Weekly magazines published in Finland